Marcus Daniell and Artem Sitak were the defending champions but chose not to defend their title.

Roberto Quiroz and Caio Zampieri won the title after defeating Hans Hach Verdugo and Adrián Menéndez-Maceiras 6–4, 6–2 in the final.

Seeds

Draw

References
 Main Draw

San Luis Open Challenger Tour - Doubles
2017 Doubles